Hubbard is a city in Marion County, Oregon, United States. The population was 3,426 at the 2020 census. It is part of the Salem Metropolitan Statistical Area.

History 
Hubbard was named for Charles Hubbard, who was an Oregon settler in 1847. The railroad arrived in 1870 and station was situated in the town.

Geography

Demographics

2010 census
As of the census of 2010, there were 3,173 people, 958 households, and 756 families living in the city. The racial makeup of the city was 73.3% White, 0.5% African American, 2.3% Native American, 0.9% Asian, 0.1% Pacific Islander, 19.4% from other races, and 3.4% from two or more races. Hispanic or Latino of any race were 36.3% of the population.

There were 958 households, of which 49.9% had children under the age of 18 living with them, 60.9% were married couples living together, 13.0% had a female householder with no husband present, 5.0% had a male householder with no wife present, and 21.1% were non-families. 15.0% of all households were made up of individuals, and 4.7% had someone living alone who was 65 years of age or older. The average household size was 3.31 and the average family size was 3.71.

The median age in the city was 30.1 years. 33.7% of residents were under the age of 18; 9% were between the ages of 18 and 24; 30.6% were from 25 to 44; 20.1% were from 45 to 64; and 6.6% were 65 years of age or older. The gender makeup of the city was 50.3% male and 49.7% female.

2000 census
As of the census of 2000, there were 2,483 people, 753 households, and 594 families living in the city. The population density was 3,992.2 people per square mile (1,546.3/km2). There were 799 housing units at an average density of 1,284.6 per square mile (497.6/km2). The racial makeup of the city was 68.87% White, 0.32% African American, 1.93% Native American, 0.48% Asian, 0.12% Pacific Islander, 25.61% from other races, and 2.66% from two or more races. Hispanic or Latino of any race were 32.66% of the population.

There were 753 households, out of which 46.5% had children under the age of 18 living with them, 60.2% were married couples living together, 13.4% had a female householder with no husband present, and 21.0% were non-families. 15.4% of all households were made up of individuals, and 5.7% had someone living alone who was 65 years of age or older. The average household size was 3.30 and the average family size was 3.67.

In the city, the population was spread out, with 34.5% under the age of 18, 9.1% from 18 to 24, 32.8% from 25 to 44, 16.4% from 45 to 64, and 7.2% who were 65 years of age or older. The median age was 29 years. For every 100 females, there were 102.2 males. For every 100 females age 18 and over, there were 100.6 males.

The median income for a household in the city was $38,850, and the median income for a family was $42,552. Males had a median income of $32,731 versus $24,226 for females. The per capita income for the city was $14,383. About 11.0% of families and 14.8% of the population were below the poverty line, including 20.0% of those under age 18 and 9.0% of those age 65 or over.

Transportation
 Lenhardt Airpark

Notable people
 Bill Bevens (1916–1991), U.S. baseball player
 Sally Hughes-Schrader (1895–1984), zoologist
 Marion Eugene Carl (1915-1998), World War II fighter ace
Levi Rolla Cooper aka Tucker Knight (born 1990), wrestler

References

External links
 Entry for Hubbard in the Oregon Blue Book

Cities in Oregon
Cities in Marion County, Oregon
Salem, Oregon metropolitan area
1891 establishments in Oregon
Populated places established in 1891